Henrica is a genus of crustose lichens in the family Verrucariaceae. It has four species. The genus was circumscribed by Maurice Bouly de Lesdain in 1921, with Henrica ramulosa assigned as the type species. The generic name Henrica honours Italian clergyman and lichenologist Joseph-Marie Henry (1870–1947).

Species 
 Henrica americana 
 Henrica melaspora  
 Henrica ramulosa  
 Henrica theleodes

References

Verrucariales
Eurotiomycetes genera
Lichen genera
Taxa described in 1921
Taxa named by Maurice Bouly de Lesdain